Quiet and Peace is the ninth studio album by American alternative rock band Buffalo Tom. It was released on March 2, 2018 under Schoolkids Records.  It was their first album in seven years.

Critical reception
Quiet and Peace was met with "generally favorable" reviews from critics. At Metacritic, which assigns a weighted average rating out of 100 to reviews from mainstream publications, this release received an average score of 76, based on 9 reviews. Aggregator Album of the Year gave the release a 72 out of 100 based on a critical consensus of 7 reviews.

Track listing

Personnel 
Bill Janovitz - guitars, vocals, keyboards
Chris Colbourn - bass guitar, vocals, guitar
Tom Maginnis - drums, percussion
Chris Cote, Erica Mantone, Andrea Gillis, Jennifer D'Angora - backing vocals ("Overtime")
Dave Minehan - backing vocals ("In the Ice")
Lucy Janovitz - backing vocals ("The Only Living Boy in New York")
Erica Mantone - backing vocals ("CatVMouse")
Sarah Jessop - vocals ("See High the Hemlock Grows")
Buffalo Tom - production
John Agnello - mixing
Greg Calbi - mastering

References 

Buffalo Tom albums
2018 albums